Robert Washington Jones (born December 25, 1959) is a former American football linebacker. He played five seasons for the New York Giants. He was Special Teams Captain of the 1986 Giants team that won Super Bowl XXI. For his play during the Super Bowl year, Jones was awarded Special Teams Player of the Year by the Giants organization and also named the Special Teams Captain during the 1986 Super Bowl campaign. 

Jones attended the University of Alabama and was picked 309th overall in the 1983 NFL Draft. He served as backup inside linebacker during most of his career with the Giants.

External links
Profile at NFL.com

1959 births
Living people
American football linebackers
Alabama Crimson Tide football players
New York Giants players
People from Demopolis, Alabama